Syracuse is a historic city on the Italian island of Sicily, the capital of the Italian province of Syracuse. The city is notable for its rich Greek and Roman history, culture, amphitheatres, architecture, and as the birthplace and home of the pre-eminent mathematician and engineer Archimedes. This 2,700-year-old city played a key role in ancient times, when it was one of the major powers of the Mediterranean world. Syracuse is located in the southeast corner of the island of Sicily, next to the Gulf of Syracuse beside the Ionian Sea. It is situated in a drastic rise of land with  depths being close to the city offshore although the city itself is generally not so hilly in comparison.

The city was founded by Ancient Greek Corinthians and Teneans and became a very powerful city-state. Syracuse was allied with Sparta and Corinth and exerted influence over the entirety of Magna Graecia, of which it was the most important city. Described by Cicero as "the greatest Greek city and the most beautiful of them all", it equaled Athens in size during the fifth century BC. It later became part of the Roman Republic and the Byzantine Empire. Under Emperor Constans II, it served as the capital of the Byzantine Empire (663–669). Palermo later overtook it in importance, as the capital of the Kingdom of Sicily. Eventually the kingdom would be united with the Kingdom of Naples to form the Two Sicilies until the Italian unification of 1860.

In the modern day, the city is listed by UNESCO as a World Heritage Site along with the Necropolis of Pantalica. In the central area, the city itself has a population of around 125,000 people. Syracuse is mentioned in the Bible in the Acts of the Apostles book at 28:12 as Paul stayed there. The patron saint of the city is Saint Lucy; she was born in Syracuse and her feast day, Saint Lucy's Day, is celebrated on 13 December.

History

Archaic period 

Syracuse and its surrounding area have been inhabited since ancient times, as shown by the findings in the villages of Stentinello, Ognina, Plemmirio, Matrensa, Cozzo Pantano and Thapsos, which already had a relationship with Mycenaean Greece.

Syracuse was founded in 734 or 733 BC by Greek settlers from Corinth and Tenea, led by the oecist (colonizer) Archias. There are many attested variants of the name of the city including  Syrakousai,  Syrakosai and  Syrakō. The most acceptable theory is that the Phoenicians called it Sour-ha-Koussim, which means "Stone of the seagulls" from which would come the name of Syracuse. A possible origin of the city's name was given by Vibius Sequester citing first Stephanus Byzantius in that there was a Syracusian marsh called Syrako and secondly Marcian's Periegesis wherein Archias gave the city the name of a nearby marsh; hence one gets Syrako (and thereby Syrakousai and other variants) for the name of Syracuse, a name also attested by Epicharmus. The settlement of Syracuse was a planned event, as a strong central leader, Arkhias the aristocrat, laid out how property would be divided up for the settlers, as well as plans for how the streets of the settlement should be arranged, and how wide they should be. The nucleus of the ancient city was the small island of Ortygia. The settlers found the land fertile and the native tribes to be reasonably well-disposed to their presence. The city grew and prospered, and for some time stood as the most powerful Greek city anywhere in the Mediterranean. Colonies were founded at Akrai (664 BC), Kasmenai (643 BC), Akrillai (7th century BC), Helorus (7th century BC) and Kamarina (598 BC).

Classical period

The descendants of the first colonists, called Gamoroi, held power until they were expelled by the lower class of the city assisted by Cyllyrians, identified as enslaved natives similar in status to the helots of Sparta. The former, however, returned to power in 485 BC, thanks to the help of Gelo, ruler of Gela. Gelo himself became the despot of the city, and moved many inhabitants of Gela, Kamarina and Megara to Syracuse, building the new quarters of Tyche and Neapolis outside the walls. His program of new constructions included a new theatre, designed by Damocopos, which gave the city a flourishing cultural life: this in turn attracted personalities as Aeschylus, Ario of Methymna and Eumelos of Corinth. The enlarged power of Syracuse made unavoidable the clash against the Carthaginians, who ruled western Sicily. In the Battle of Himera, Gelo, who had allied with Theron of Agrigento, decisively defeated the African force led by Hamilcar. A temple dedicated to Athena (on the site of today's Cathedral), was erected in the city to commemorate the event.

Syracuse grew considerably during this time. Its walls encircled  in the fifth century, but as early as the 470s BC the inhabitants started building outside the walls. The complete population of its territory approximately numbered 250,000 in 415 BC and the population size of the city itself was probably similar to Athens.

Gelo was succeeded by his brother Hiero, who fought against the Etruscans at Cumae in 474 BC. His rule was eulogized by poets like Simonides of Ceos, Bacchylides and Pindar, who visited his court. A democratic regime was introduced by Thrasybulos (467 BC). The city continued to expand in Sicily, fighting against the rebellious Siculi, and on the Tyrrhenian Sea, making expeditions up to Corsica and Elba. In the late 5th century BC, Syracuse found itself at war with Athens, which sought more resources to fight the Peloponnesian War. The Syracusans enlisted the aid of a general from Sparta, Athens' foe in the war, to defeat the Athenians, destroy their ships, and leave them to starve on the island (see Sicilian Expedition). In 401 BC, Syracuse contributed a force of 300 hoplites and a general to Cyrus the Younger's Army of the Ten Thousand.

Then in the early 4th century BC, the tyrant Dionysius the Elder was again at war against Carthage and, although losing Gela and Camarina, kept that power from capturing the whole of Sicily. After the end of the conflict Dionysius built a massive fortress on Ortygia and 22 km-long walls around all of Syracuse. Another period of expansion saw the destruction of Naxos, Catania and Lentini; then Syracuse entered again in war against Carthage (397 BC). After various changes of fortune, the Carthaginians managed to besiege Syracuse itself, but were eventually pushed back by a pestilence. A treaty in 392 BC allowed Syracuse to enlarge further its possessions, founding the cities of Adranon, Tyndarion and Tauromenos, and conquering Rhegion on the continent. In the Adriatic, to facilitate trade, Dionysius the Elder founded Ancona, Adria and Issa. Apart from his battle deeds, Dionysius was famous as a patron of art, and Plato himself visited Syracuse several times, where Dionysius, offended by Plato's daring to disagree with the king, imprisoned the philosopher and sold him into slavery.

His successor was Dionysius the Younger, who was however expelled by Dion in 356 BC. But the latter's despotic rule led in turn to his expulsion, and Dionysius reclaimed his throne in 347 BC. Dionysius was besieged in Syracuse by the Syracusan general Hicetas in 344 BC. The following year the Corinthian Timoleon installed a democratic regime in the city after he exiled Dionysius and defeated Hicetas. The long series of internal struggles had weakened Syracuse's power on the island, and Timoleon tried to remedy this, defeating the Carthaginians in the Battle of the Crimissus (339 BC).

Hellenistic period

After Timoleon's death the struggle among the city's parties restarted and ended with the rise of another tyrant, Agathocles, who seized power with a coup in 317 BC. He resumed the war against Carthage, with alternate fortunes. He was besieged in Syracuse by the Carthaginians in 311 BC, but he escaped from the city with a small fleet. He scored a moral success, bringing the war to the Carthaginians' native African soil, inflicting heavy losses to the enemy. The defenders of Syracuse destroyed the Carthaginian army which besieged them. However, Agathocles was eventually defeated in Africa as well. The war ended with another treaty of peace which did not prevent the Carthaginians from interfering in the politics of Syracuse after the death of Agathocles (289 BC). They laid siege to Syracuse for the fourth and last time in 278 BC. They retreated at the arrival of king Pyrrhus of Epirus, whom Syracuse had asked for help. After a brief period under the rule of Epirus, Hiero II seized power in 275 BC.

Hiero inaugurated a period of 50 years of peace and prosperity, in which Syracuse became one of the most renowned capitals of Antiquity. He issued the so-called Lex Hieronica, which was later adopted by the Romans for their administration of Sicily; he also had the theatre enlarged and a new immense altar, the "Hiero's Ara", built. Under his rule lived the most famous Syracusan, the mathematician and natural philosopher Archimedes. Among his many inventions were various military engines including the claw of Archimedes, later used to resist the Roman siege of 214–212 BC. Literary figures included Theocritus and others.

Hiero's successor, the young Hieronymus (ruled from 215 BC), broke the alliance with the Romans after their defeat at the Battle of Cannae and accepted Carthage's support. The Romans, led by consul Marcus Claudius Marcellus, besieged the city in 214 BC. The city held out for three years, but fell in 212 BC. The successes of the Syracusians in repelling the Roman siege had made them overconfident. In 212 BC, the Romans received information that the city's inhabitants were to participate in the annual festival to their goddess Artemis. A small party of Roman soldiers approached the city under the cover of night and managed to scale the walls to get into the outer city and with reinforcements soon took control, killing Archimedes in the process, but the main fortress remained firm. After an eight-month siege and with parleys in progress, an Iberian captain named Moeriscus is believed to have let the Romans in near the Fountains of Arethusa. On the agreed signal, during a diversionary attack, he opened the gate. After setting guards on the houses of the pro-Roman faction, Marcellus gave Syracuse to plunder.

Imperial Roman and Byzantine period 

Though declining slowly through the years, Syracuse maintained the status of capital of the Roman government of Sicily and seat of the praetor. It remained an important port for trade between the Eastern and the Western parts of the Empire. Christianity spread in the city through the efforts of Paul of Tarsus and Saint Marziano, the first bishop of the city, who made it one of the main centres of proselytism in the West. In the age of Christian persecutions massive catacombs were carved, whose size is second only to those of Rome.

After a period of Vandal rule, 469–477, Syracuse and the island was recovered for Roman rule under Odoacer, 476–491 and Theodoric the Great, 491–526, by Belisarius for the Byzantine Empire (31 December 535). From 663 to 668 Syracuse was the seat of the Greek-speaking Emperor Constans II, as well as a capital of the Byzantine (Eastern Roman) Empire and metropolis of the whole Sicilian Church. Constans II was assassinated when his plans to permanently replace the Byzantine capital of Constantinople with Syracuse became suspected.

Emirate of Sicily 

The city was besieged by the Aghlabids for almost a year in 827–828, but Byzantine reinforcements prevented its fall. It remained the center of Byzantine resistance to the gradual Muslim conquest of Sicily until it fell to the Aghlabids after another siege on 20/21 May 878. During the two centuries of Muslim rule, the capital of the Emirate of Sicily was moved from Syracuse to Palermo. The cathedral was converted into a mosque and the quarter on the Ortygia island was gradually rebuilt along Islamic styles. The city, nevertheless, maintained important trade relationships, and housed a relatively flourishing cultural and artistic life: several Arab poets, including Ibn Hamdis, the most important Sicilian Arab poet of the 12th century, flourished in the city.

Norman kingdom of Sicily 

In 1038, the Byzantine general George Maniakes reconquered the city, sending the relics of St. Lucy to Constantinople. The eponymous castle on the cape of Ortygia bears his name, although it was built under the Hohenstaufen rule. In 1085 the Normans entered Syracuse, one of the last Arab strongholds, after a summer-long siege by Roger I of Sicily and his son Jordan of Hauteville, who was given the city as count. New quarters were built, and the cathedral was restored, as well as other churches.

High medieval period 
In 1194, Emperor Henry VI occupied the Sicilian kingdom, including Syracuse. After a short period of Genoese rule (1205–1220) under the notorious admiral and pirate Alamanno da Costa, which favoured a rise of trades, royal authority was re-asserted in the city by Frederick II. He began the construction of the Castello Maniace, the Bishops' Palace and the Bellomo Palace. Frederick's death brought a period of unrest and feudal anarchy. In the War of the Sicilian Vespers between the Angevin and Aragonese dynasties for control of Sicily, Syracuse sided with the Aragonese and expelled the Angevins in 1298, receiving from the Spanish sovereigns great privileges in reward. The preeminence of baronial families is also shown by the construction of the palaces of Abela, Chiaramonte, Nava, Montalto.

16th–20th centuries 
The city was struck by two ruinous earthquakes in 1542 and 1693, and a plague in 1729. The 17th century destruction changed the appearance of Syracuse forever, as well as the entire Val di Noto, whose cities were rebuilt along the typical lines of Sicilian Baroque, considered one of the most typical expressions of the architecture of Southern Italy. The spread of cholera in 1837 led to a revolt against the Bourbon government. The punishment was the move of the province capital seat to Noto, but the unrest had not been totally choked, as the Siracusani took part in the Sicilian revolution of 1848.

After the Unification of Italy of 1865, Syracuse regained its status of provincial capital. In the late 19th century, the walls (including Porta Ligny) were demolished and a bridge connecting the mainland to Ortygia island was built. In the following year a railway link was constructed.

Modern history 
Both Allied and German bombings in 1943 caused heavy destruction during World War II. Operation Husky, the codename for the Allied invasion of Sicily, was launched on the night between 9–10 July 1943 with British forces attacking the southeast of the island. The plan was for the British 5th Infantry Division, part of General Sir Bernard Montgomery's Eighth Army, to capture Syracuse on the first day of the invasion.  This part of the operation went completely according to plan, and British forces captured Syracuse on the first night of the operation. The port was then used as a base for the British Royal Navy. To the west of the city is a Commonwealth War Graves cemetery where about 1,000 men are buried. After the end of the war the northern quarters of Syracuse experienced a heavy, often chaotic, expansion, favoured by the quick process of industrialization.

Syracuse today has about 125,000 inhabitants and numerous attractions for the visitor interested in historical sites (such as the Ear of Dionysius). A process of recovering and restoring the historical centre has been ongoing since the 1990s. Nearby places of note include Catania, Noto, Modica and Ragusa.

Geography

Climate 
Syracuse experiences a hot-summer Mediterranean climate (Köppen climate classification Csa) with mild, wet winters and warm to hot, dry summers. Snow is infrequent; the last heavy snowfall in the city occurred in December 2014. Frosts are very rare, with the last one also happening in December 2014 when the temperature dropped to the all-time record low of 0 °C.

Guidi underlines that the reported data by SAIS "is produced directly by the stations and is not subject to any control and validation procedure, neither automatic nor manual. It can therefore report errors due to sensor malfunctions as well as maintenance interventions".

Government

Demographics 
In 2016, there were 122,051 people residing in Syracuse, located in the province of Syracuse, Sicily, of whom 48.7% were male and 51.3% were female. Minors (children ages 18 and younger) totalled 18.9 percent of the population compared to pensioners who number 16.9 percent. This compares with the Italian average of 18.1 percent (minors) and 19.9 percent (pensioners). The average age of Syracuse resident is 40 compared to the Italian average of 42. In the five years between 2002 and 2007, the population of Syracuse declined by 0.5 percent, while Italy as a whole grew by 3.6 percent. The reason for decline is a population flight to the suburbs, and northern Italy. The current birth rate of Syracuse is 9.75 births per 1,000 inhabitants compared to the Italian average of 9.45 births.

, 97.9% of the population was of Italian descent. The largest immigrant group came from other European nations (particularly those from Poland, and the United Kingdom): 0.6%, North Africa (mostly Tunisian): 0.5%, and South Asia: 0.4%.

Tourism 

Since 2005, the entire city of Syracuse, along with the Necropolis of Pantalica which falls within the province of Syracuse, has been listed as a World Heritage Site by UNESCO. This programme aims to catalogue, name, and conserve sites of outstanding cultural or natural importance to the common heritage of humanity. The deciding committee which evaluates potential candidates described their reasons for choosing Syracuse because "monuments and archeological sites situated in Syracuse are the finest example of outstanding architectural creation spanning several cultural aspects; Greek, Roman and Baroque", following on that Ancient Syracuse was "directly linked to events, ideas and literary works of outstanding universal significance".

Buildings of the Greek and Roman periods 

 The city walls
 The Temple of Apollo, at Piazza Emanuele Pancali, adapted to a church in Byzantine times and to a mosque under Arab rule.
 The Fountain of Arethusa, on the Ortygia island. According to a legend, the nymph Arethusa, hunted by Alpheus, took shelter here.
 The Greek Theatre, whose cavea is one of the largest ever built by the ancient Greeks: it has 67 rows, divided into nine sections with eight aisles. Only traces of the scene and the orchestra remain. The edifice (still used today) was modified by the Romans, who adapted it to their different style of spectacles, including also circus games. Near the theatre are the latomìe, stone quarries, also used as prisons in ancient times. The most famous latomìa is the Orecchio di Dionisio ("Ear of Dionysius").
 The Roman amphitheatre. It was partly carved out from the rock. In the centre of the area is a rectangular space which was used for the scenic machinery.
 The Tomb of Archimede, in the Grotticelli Necropolis. Decorated with two Doric columns.
 The Temple of Olympian Zeus, about  outside the city, built around the 6th century BC.

Buildings of the Christian period 

 Cathedral of Syracuse: built by bishop Zosimo in the 7th-century over the great Temple of Athena (5th century BC), on Ortygia island. This was a Doric edifice with six columns on the short sides and 14 on the long sides: these are still incorporated into the walls of the cathedral. The base of the temple had three steps. The interior of the church has a nave and two aisles. The roof of the nave is from Norman times, as well as the mosaics in the apses. The façade was rebuilt by Andrea Palma in 1725–1753, with a double order of Corinthian columns, and statues by Ignazio Marabitti. The interior houses a 12th-13th-century marble font, a silver statue of St Lucy by Pietro Rizzo (1599), a ciborium by Luigi Vanvitelli, and a statue of the Madonna della Neve ("Madonna of the Snow", 1512) by Antonello Gagini.
 Basilica of Santa Lucia Extra moenia: a Byzantine church built (after Norman rebuilt), according to tradition, in the same place of the martyrdom of the saint in 303 AD. The current appearance is from the 15th–16th centuries. The most ancient parts still preserved include the portal, the three half-circular apses and the first two orders of the belfry. Under the church are the Catacombs of St. Lucy. For this church Caravaggio painted the Burial of St. Lucy.
 Madonna delle Lacrime: (Our Lady of Tears Shrine) 20th century shrine church.
 San Benedetto: 16th century church, restored after 1693. It houses a painting depicting Death of Saint Benedict by the Caravaggisti Mario Minniti.
 Chiesa della Concezione (14th century, rebuilt in the 18th century), with the annexed Benedictine convent.
 San Cristoforo: 14th century church, rebuilt in 18th-century.
 San Giovanni Battista: 14th century church.
 San Filippo Apostolo: 18th-century church with stairs down to a Jewish ritual bath (Mikvah) dating to prior to the expulsion of Jews in 1492
 San Filippo Neri: 17th-century facade and interior reconstructed in 18th-century
 San Francesco all'Immacolata: church with a convex façade intermingled by columns and pilaster strips. It housed an ancient celebration, the Svelata ("Revelation"), in which an image of the Madonna was unveiled at dawn of 29 November.
 San Giovanni Evangelista: basilica church built by the Normans and destroyed in 1693. Only partially restored, it was erected over an ancient crypt of the martyr San Marciano, later destroyed by the Arabs. The main altar is Byzantine. It includes the Catacombs of San Giovanni, featuring a maze of tunnels and passages, with thousands of tombs and several frescoes.
 San Giuseppe: 18th-century octagonal church, in disrepair
 Santa Lucia alla Badia: Baroque sanctuary church built after the 1693 earthquake. 
 Santa Maria dei Miracoli: 14th century church.
 San Martino: 6th-century church, 14th-century facade, 18th-century interiors
 San Paolo Apostolo: 18th century church.
 Spirito Santo: 18th-century church.
 Church of the Jesuit College, a majestic, Baroque building.

 Other notable buildings 

 Castello Maniace, constructed between 1232 and 1240, is an example of the military architecture of Frederick II's reign. It is a square structure with circular towers at each of the four corners. The most striking feature is the pointed portal, decorated with polychrome marbles.
 Archaeological Museum with collections including findings from the mid-Bronze Age to 5th century BC.
 Palazzo Lanza Buccheri (16th century).
 Palazzo Bellomo (12th century), which contains an art museum that houses Antonello da Messina's Annunciation (1474).
 Palazzo Montalto (14th century), which conserves the old façade from the 14th century, with a pointed portal.
 Archbishop's Palace (17th century, modified in the following century). It houses the Alagonian Library, founded in the late 18th century.
 Palazzo Vermexio: current Town Hall, includes fragments of an Ionic temple of the 5th century BC.
 Palazzo Francica Nava, with parts of the original 16th century building surviving.
 Palazzo Beneventano del Bosco, originally built in the Middle Ages but extensively modified between 1779 and 1788. It has a pleasant internal court.
 Palazzo Migliaccio (15th century), with notable lava inlay decorations.
 The Senate Palace, housing in the court an 18th-century coach.
 Castle of Euryalos, built  outside the city by Dionysius the Elder and which was one of the most powerful fortresses of ancient times. It had three moats with a series of underground galleries which allowed the defenders to remove the materials the attackers could use to fill them.
 Mikveh: a bath used for the purpose of ritual immersion in Judaism, built during the Byzantine era. It is situated in the Giudecca: the ancient Jewish Ghetto of Syracuse.
 Monument to the Italians Fallen in Africa, Siracusa

 Famous people 
 Archimedes, classical Greek mathematician, physicist and engineer
 Antiochus of Syracuse, a Greek historian
 Achaeus of Syracuse, a Greek tragedian
 Themistogenes, Greek historian. He wrote about the Anabasis and some other works about the Syracuse.
 Theocritus, Greek poet and creator of Ancient Greek pastoral poetry
 Saint Lucy, Roman martyr
 Pope Stephen III
 Ibn Hamdis, Sicilian Arab poet
 Vincenzo Mirabella (1570-1624), humanist and pioneer of archaeology
 Claudio Schifano (born 1953), contemporary artist of informal painting

 Sports 

Syracuse is home to association football club A.S.D. Città di Siracusa, the latest reincarnation of several clubs dating back to 1924. The common feature is the azure shirts, hence the nickname Azzurri. Siracusa play at the Stadio Nicola De Simone with an approximate capacity between 5,000 and 6,000.

 See also 
 Cassibile (village)
 Greek coinage of Italy and Sicily
 Malèna'' – a 2000 romantic comedy-drama film starring Monica Bellucci and Giuseppe Sulfaro was mostly produced in Syracuse
 Peloponnesian League
 Sicilian Wars
 Siracusa International Institute for Criminal Justice and Human Rights
 Siracusa railway station

Notes

References

Further reading

External links 

 
 Coins from ancient Syracuse and Sicily
 Livius.org: History of Syracuse 
 Photos of Ortigia in Syracuse 

 
8th-century BC establishments in Italy
Archaeological sites in Sicily
Cities and towns in Sicily
Coastal towns in Sicily
Corinthian colonies
Dorian colonies in Magna Graecia
Mediterranean port cities and towns in Italy
Municipalities of the Province of Syracuse
Populated places established in the 8th century BC
Sicilian Baroque
World Heritage Sites in Italy
Greek city-states